Oberndorf is a suburban district of Rottenburg am Neckar in the administrative district of Tübingen in Baden-Württemberg (Germany).

Geography

Oberndorf is located 6 km (3.7 mi) northern from Rottenburg, 10 km (6.2 mi) western from Tübingen and 14 km (8.7 mi) southeastern from Herrenberg.

Extent

Oberdorf has a territory of 614 hectares. Thereof fall 70.1% upon agriculturally used area, 15.7% upon forest area, 13.7% upon settlement area and roads, 0.2% upon water expanse and 0.3% upon other.

Population

1466 people live in Oberndorf (31/01/08). It is one of the larger suburbs of Rottenburg. At an area of 6.14 km2 (2.4 sq mi) this corresponds to a population density of 239 people per km2, or 618 per sq mi.

Faiths

The population is predominantly Roman Catholic.

References

External links
  

Rottenburg am Neckar